Kiribati participated in the 2010 Summer Youth Olympics in Singapore City, Singapore. 4 athletes received the right to participate in championships.

Participants

Athletics

Boys
Track and road events

Girls
Track and road events

Taekwondo

Women's

Weightlifting

Boys

References

External links

Competitors List: Kiribati

Youth
Nations at the 2010 Summer Youth Olympics
Kiribati at the Youth Olympics